Jayalakshmi, whose popular screen name was Fatafat Jayalakshmi (also Phataphat Jayalaxmi) (1958–1980), was an Indian actress active mainly in Tamil and Telugu films. In Malayalam movies she was known as Supriya. She acted about 66 movies in Tamil, Telugu, Malayalam and Kannada within a decade of her career.

Career
She made her debut in 1972 in Telugu movie Iddaru Ammayilu which has Akkineni Nageswara Rao in lead role. Same year she appeared in A. Vincent's Malayalam movie Theerthayathra with screen name Supriya, followed by Ithu Manushyano? in 1973. In 1974 she made her Tamil debut in K Balachander's film Aval Oru Thodar Kathai credited as Jayalakshmi. She became a household name with her popular dialogue ‘Fatafat’ (meaning quickly) which became her prefix. Her notable films include Aval Oru Thodar Kathai, Anthuleni Katha, Aarilirunthu Arubathu Varai and Mullum Malarum. She had co-starred with top actors like Rajinikanth, Kamal Haasan, Krishna, NTR and Chiranjeevi.

In 2018, during an interview with Rajinikanth, when he was asked to pick his favorite actress he choose Fatafat Jayalakshmi and told the audience that she was a good actress though they paired in very few movies together.

Personal life
She was married to the nephew of M. G. Ramachandran. She committed suicide by hanging in 1980 when she was at the peak of her career over an alleged failed romance.

Partial filmography

Telugu

 Iddaru Ammayilu (1972) - Debut film in Telugu
 Abhimaanavanthulu (1973)
 Swargam Narakam (1975) 
 Jyothi (1976) - Sashirekha
 Anthuleni Katha (1976)
 Bhale Alludu (1977)
 Eenati Bandham Yenatido (1977)
 Chilipi Krishnudu (1978) - Aasa
 Yuga Purushudu (1978) - Rosy
 Korikale Gurralaite (1979)
 Muttaiduva (1979)
 Jathara (1980)
 Ram Robert Rahim (1980) 
 Potharillu (1980)
 Nyayam Kavali (1981) - Jayalaxmi (Suresh's wife)
 Tirugu Leni Manishi (1981) - Padma

Tamil

 Aval Oru Thodar Kathai (1974) - Debut film in Tamil as Chandra
 Ezhaikkum Kaalam Varum (1975)
 Mayangukiral Oru Maadhu (1975)
 Yarukku Maappillai Yaro (1975)
 Pattikkaattu Raja (1975)
 Mogam Muppadhu Varusham (1976)
 Payanam (1976) as Jaya
 Annakili (1976) as Sumathi
 Naam Pirandha Mann (1977)
 Nandha En Nila (1977)
 Pennai Solli Kutramillai (1977)
 Perumaikkuriyaval (1977) as Bhama
 Punniyam Seithaval (1977)
 Sorgam Naragam (1977) as Jayalakshmi
 Avar Enakke Sontham (1977)
 Kavikuyil (1977)
 Athaivida Ragasiyam (1978)
 Iraivan Kodutha Varam (1978)
 Sakka Podu Podu Raja (1978)
 Kamatchiyin Karunai (1978)
 Varuvan Vadivelan (1978) as Vijay's wife
 Mullum Malarum (1978) as Manga
 Kumkumam Kadhai Solgiradhu (1978)
 Thyagam (1978)
 Uravugal Endrum Vaazhga (1979)
 Aarilirunthu Arubathu Varai (1979)
 Kizhakkum Merkum Sandhikkindrana (1979)
 Kaali (1980)
 Nadhiyai Thedi Vandha Kadal (1980)
 Thiruppangal (1981)
 Yamirukka Bayamen (1983) - Released posthumously

Malayalam : Credited as Supriya
 Theerthayathra (1972) as Parvathy  - Debut film in Malayalam
 Ithu Manushyano? (1973)
 Darsanam (1973)
 Sreedevi (1977)
 Prathyaksha Daivam (1978)

Kannada
 Ondu Hennu Aaru Kannu (1980)

References

External links
 

1958 births
1980 deaths
Indian film actresses
Actresses from Chennai
20th-century Indian actresses
Actresses in Malayalam cinema
Actresses in Tamil cinema
Actresses in Telugu cinema
Actresses in Kannada cinema
1980 suicides
Suicides by hanging in India
Artists who committed suicide
Female suicides